The 2015–16 season was Unione Calcio Sampdoria's third season back in Serie A after having been relegated at the end of the 2011–12 season. The team competed in Serie A, finishing a disappointing 15th; in the Coppa Italia, where they were eliminated in the Round of 16; and in the UEFA Europa League, where the club was eliminated in the third qualifying round following a shocking 4–0 home defeat to Serbian club Vojvodina, losing the tie 4–2 on aggregate.

Players

Squad information

Transfers

In

 

Total spending:   €0.00 million

Out

Total income:  €3.00 Million

Total expenditure:   €0.00 Million

Pre-season and friendlies

Competitions

Serie A

League table

Results summary

Results by round

Matches

Coppa Italia

UEFA Europa League

Third qualifying round

Statistics

Appearances and goals

|-
! colspan="14" style="background:#dcdcdc; text-align:center"| Goalkeepers

|-
! colspan="14" style="background:#dcdcdc; text-align:center"| Defenders

|-
! colspan="14" style="background:#dcdcdc; text-align:center"| Midfielders

|-
! colspan="14" style="background:#dcdcdc; text-align:center"| Forwards

|-
! colspan="14" style="background:#dcdcdc; text-align:center"| Players transferred out during the season

Goalscorers

Last updated: 14 May 2016

Clean sheets
Last updated: 14 May 2016

References

U.C. Sampdoria seasons
Sampdoria
Sampdoria